New St Helens and District Tramways  and St Helens Corporation Tramways  operated a tramway service in St Helens between 1897 and 1936.

History

St Helens Corporation took over the St Helens and District Tramways Company on 1 April 1897. The operation of the tramway was leased back to the former company.

New St Helens and District Tramways

On 4 November 1898 the operating company changed its name to the New St Helens and District Tramways.

The Corporation undertook a modernisation and electrification programme and the first electric services started on 20 July 1899.

In 1902 extensions to the system included connections with the South Lancashire Tramways system at Haydock. and the Liverpool and Prescot Light Railway, at Brooks Bridge.

St Helens Corporation Tramways

The corporation took over operation of the services on 1 October 1919.

Closure

The tramway closed on 31 March 1936.

See also 

 St Helens power station

References

Tram transport in England
History of St Helens, Merseyside
Transport in St Helens, Merseyside
Historic transport in Merseyside